Color vision, a proximate adaptation of the vision sensory modality, allows for the discrimination of light based on its wavelength components.

Improved detection sensitivity

The evolutionary process of switching from a single photopigment to two different pigments would have provided early ancestors with a sensitivity advantage in two ways.

In one way, adding a new pigment would allow them to see a wider range of the electromagnetic spectrum. Secondly, new random connections would create wavelength opponency and the new wavelength opponent neurons would be much more sensitive than the non-wavelength opponent neurons. This is the result of some wavelength distributions favouring excitation instead of inhibition. Both excitation and inhibition would be features of a neural substrate during the formation of a second pigment. Overall, the advantage gained from increased sensitivity with wavelength opponency would open up opportunities for future exploitation by mutations and even further improvement.

Invertebrates 

Color vision requires a number of opsin molecules with different absorbance peaks, and at least three opsins were present in the ancestor of arthropods; chelicerates and pancrustaceans today possess color vision.

Vertebrates 

Researchers studying the opsin genes responsible for color-vision pigments have long known that four photopigment opsins exist in birds, reptiles and teleost fish. This indicates that the common ancestor of amphibians and amniotes (≈350 million years ago) had tetrachromatic vision — the ability to see four dimensions of color.

Mammals 
Today, most mammals possess dichromatic vision, corresponding to protanopia red–green color blindness. They can thus see violet, blue, green and yellow light, but cannot see ultraviolet, and deep red light. This was probably a feature of the first mammalian ancestors, which were likely small, nocturnal, and burrowing.

At the time of the Cretaceous–Paleogene extinction event  million years ago, the burrowing ability probably helped mammals survive extinction. Mammalian species of the time had already started to differentiate, but were still generally small, comparable in size to shrews; this small size would have helped them to find shelter in protected environments.

Monotremes and marsupials 
It is postulated that some early monotremes, marsupials, and placentals were semiaquatic or burrowing, as there are multiple mammalian lineages with such habits today. Any burrowing or semiaquatic mammal would have had additional protection from Cretaceous–Paleogene boundary environmental stresses. However, many such species evidently possessed poor color vision in comparison with non-mammalian vertebrate species of the time, including reptiles, birds, and amphibians.

Primates 

Since the beginning of the Paleogene Period, surviving mammals enlarged, moving away by adaptive radiation from a burrowing existence and into the open, although most species kept their relatively poor color vision. Exceptions occur for some marsupials (which possibly kept their original color vision) and some primates—including humans. Primates, as an order of mammals, began to emerge around the beginning of the Paleogene Period.

Primates have re-developed trichromatic color vision since that time, by the mechanism of gene duplication, being under unusually high evolutionary pressure to develop color vision better than the mammalian standard. Ability to perceive red and orange hues allows tree-dwelling primates to discern them from green. This is particularly important for primates in the detection of red and orange fruit, as well as nutrient-rich new foliage, in which the red and orange carotenoids have not yet been masked by chlorophyll.

Another theory is that detecting skin flushing and thereby mood may have influenced the development of primate trichromate vision. The color red also has other effects on primate and human behavior, as discussed in the color psychology article.

Today, among simians, the catarrhines (Old World monkeys and apes, including humans) are routinely trichromatic—meaning that both males and females possess three opsins, sensitive to short-wave, medium-wave, and long-wave light—while, conversely, only a small fraction of platyrrhine primates (New World monkeys) are trichromats.

See also 
 Evolution of color vision in primates
 Evolution of the eye

References 

Color vision
Colour vision